The Pan American U20 Athletics Championships are a biennial sports event for track and field organized by the Association of Panamerican Athletics (APA) open for junior (U20) athletes from member and associate member associations. They were first held in 1980. Before the 2017 edition, the event was known as Pan American Junior Athletics Championships.

Editions

Championships records

Men

Women

Notes

References

 
Under-20 athletics competitions
Recurring sporting events established in 1980
U20
Biennial athletics competitions